Jaideep Saikia is a top South Asian security and terrorism expert. He has served the Governments of India and Assam in security advisory capacities, including a stint as an "Expert on Northeast India in the National Security Council Secretariat". Jaideep Saikia is also a celebrated theorist and expert on Islamic State, al-Qaeda and Islamic terror groups of all hues and denominations. He is an authority on Islamist related violence in Afghanistan, Bangladesh and the Indian sub-continent and has written authoritative papers on the subject - especially after his tour of Bangladesh in March 2016. Saikia who had been a State Guest to Pakistan in 1988 was also a Senior Fellow at the "Vivekananda International Foundation" in Delhi, where he worked with current National Security Adviser Ajit Doval. Jaideep Saikia is also considered to be an authority on the India-China Boundary issue as it pertains to the Eastern Sector and his 2014 theory of the "Line of Amity"
(https://www.globalorder.live/post/examining-the-line-of-amity-a-proposed-india-china-border-settlement) has of late, witnessed enormous traction and is being closely studied by experts on boundary resolution. He toured the People's Republic of China in 2002 and held wide ranging discussions on the India-China Boundary issue with top think tank leaders of the country including Wang Hongwei, Ma Jiali, Rong Ying, Shen Dingli and Zhang Guihong. He has co-authored papers on India-China relations with Wang Hongwei and Zhang Guihong. Saikia's paper "Quest for a Chindian Arc" published in Defense and Security Analysis (Vol:22, Number:4, December 2006) is considered to be a masterpiece on India-China relations.

He also lectures on the subject of his expertise in various forums, and is consulted by various government agencies, NGOs and Think Tanks.

He has been a member of different Indian delegations for "Track II Dialogue" with Bangladesh, China, Myanmar and Japan. Jaideep Saikia is also the first person to have translated the Assamese National Song, O Mur Apunar Desh into English. Saikia is the progenitor of novel theories including the "Line of Amity" for the India-China Boundary as it pertains to the Eastern Sector and "Counter Radicalisation" which he has been writing and lecturing about in his bid to replace what he terms is the non-existent animal called De-radicalisation. Jaideep Saikia is also in the forefront in the quest for a counter-terrorism (CT) doctrine for India and his forthcoming book "Terror Transcreated" articulates the need for a CT doctrine for India which in the words of Jaideep Saikia is "one of the most terror afflicted countries in the world ".

Education
Saikia is a graduate of the Rashtriya Indian Military College in Dehradun, St Stephen's College in Delhi, and the University of Illinois at Urbana-Champaign, where he was a Ford Fellow. Saikia has received various fellowships including ACDIS-Ford, National Foundation of India and the Regional Centre for Strategic Studies.

Books
He is also the author of the bestseller Terror Sans Frontiers: Islamist Militancy in North East India, which in the words of South Asia observer, Stephen Philip Cohen, is "One of the most important books on the question of insurgency yet to appear..." Jaideep Saikia also is a regular commentator on the ULFA, Bangladesh and Islamist extremism in South Asia, with numerous papers and books on the subject, which he has either edited or written. His  edited anthology, "Frontier in Flames: North East India in Turmoil" is a collection of essays by experts on the region and has been hailed as a seminal work on the North East. The anthology was released in New Delhi by the celebrated columnist B G Verghese in February 2008.  In his bestselling book, "Terror Sans Frontiers", Saikia had not only documented all the Islamist terror organisations that are operating in the region, but was the first to predict the entry of al-Qaeda into the Indian sub-continent.

His latest works include "Terrorism: Patterns of Internationalization", "Documents on the North East", "Circle of Treason: Bangladesh Beyond the Threat of Illegal Migration, "Shadow of Daesh", "Counter Radicalisation: In Defence of Common Sense", "Mind Over Matter", The Idea of India: Is there need for a debate" and "Point of Impact (August 2022). He has over two dozen peer reviewed published papers on security and strategy in prestigious national and international journals and has emerged as the most important commentator on national security issues pertaining to the North East and the countries abutting the region. He regularly appears on popular national and international media and is a much sought after commentator on national security. Saikia is a regular columnist with the widely circulated and prestigious "Firstpost". His recent writings are available in the Firstpost website.https://www.firstpost.com/author/jaideep-saikia
Jaideep Saikia is also a reputed poet with five published anthologies of poetry including "Neruda or Nobody" and "Quarter to Eight" which has received rave reviews in literary circles.

Awards
 Governor of Assam’s “Scroll of Honour” for commendable work for countering insurgency in Assam on 9 June 1999.
 Citations from the General Officers Commanding, 3 and 4 Corps for “invaluable and selfless contribution to the nation’s security” and for “stimulating work on a wide spectrum of evolving security paradigm” respectively in January 2021.
 “Scroll of Honour” from the Government of Assam for transcreating Assam’s National Song “O Mur Aapunar Dekh” for the first time into English, on 18 January 2021.
 Achiever 2020 Award on 21 April 2021 for Outstanding Contribution to National Security.
 Honour for Outstanding Contribution towards enriching literature and poetry of North East India on 28 July 2021
 Was selected for the 2022 Irregular Warfare Initiative Fellowship, West Point, USA 
 Was awarded the Indian army's Eastern Command's General Officer Commanding-in-Chief's Commendation Card for Outstanding Service (India's National Security) on 15 August 2022
 Was awarded the Indian army's 3 Corps "Scroll of Honour" for "Selfless & Tireless Striving to Further the Cause of India's National Security" on 18 October 2022

References

Living people
Terrorism theorists
Place of birth missing (living people)
1966 births